Helenês Cândido (5 January 1935 – 17 March 2021) was a Brazilian lawyer and politician, who served as the Governor of the state of Goiás between 1998 and 1999. 

Cândido died from COVID-19 at age 86 in Caldas Novas on 17 March 2021.

References

1935 births
2021 deaths
Governors of Goiás
Deaths from the COVID-19 pandemic in Goiás